Viktor Kalmykov is a former international speedway rider from the Soviet Union.

Speedway career 
Kalmykov reached the final of the Speedway World Championship in the 1972 Individual Speedway World Championship. He was one of six Russians that competed in the 1972 World final after strong performances in the Continental final and European final.

World final appearances

Individual World Championship
 1972 –  London, Wembley Stadium – 11th – 6pts

World Team Cup
 1972 -  Olching, (with Viktor Trofimov / Grigory Khlinovsky / Anatoly Kuzmin) - 2nd - 21 + 7pts (5 + 3)
 1974 -  Chorzów, Stadion Śląski, Chorzów (with Valery Gordeev / Mikhail Krasnov / Anatoly Kuzmin) - 4th - 10pts

References 

Russian speedway riders
Possibly living people
Year of birth missing